KRCG-FM is a non-commercial public broadcasting radio station licensed to Santa Rosa, California, serving Santa Rosa, Healdsburg, Cloverdale, Geyserville, Windsor, Sebastopol, Forestville, Calistoga and surrounding areas in California. KRCG-FM is owned and operated by Northern California Public Media.

This station transmitted with callsign KRCB-FM until Northern California Public Media acquired the 104.9 FM frequency licensed to Rohnert Park, then commercial station KDHT, in 2021; the transaction was spurred when the Kincade Fire destroyed the tower used for the 91.1 facility. The move to 104.9 gave Northern California Public Media a full-powered signal in the Santa Rosa area, and the KRCB-FM callsign was given to the bigger signal. Consequently, the KRCG-FM callsign was allocated to 91.1.

Translator
In addition to the main station, KRCG-FM is relayed by an FM translator to widen its broadcast area.

References

External links
 Radio 91 Online

1994 establishments in California
Public radio stations in the United States
NPR member stations
Radio stations established in 1994
RCG-FM